The  was created in April 1944 as a work group for Japanese women.  The official purpose was to give women a chance to serve the Empire of Japan prior to marriage, it was a means to compel women to perform war time labour duties.

See also
 Korean Women's Volunteer Labour Corps

References

Women's organizations based in Japan
Pacific theatre of World War II
Women in war
Organizations established in 1944
Organizations disestablished in 1945
1944 establishments in Japan
1945 disestablishments in Japan
History of women in Japan